A Town Without Christmas is an American made-for-television drama film. It was broadcast on CBS on December 16, 2001. The film was the first of a trilogy with subsequent sequels, Finding John Christmas (2003) and When Angels Come to Town (2004) also being aired on CBS. Peter Falk returned to play the role of the angel Max for both sequels.

Plot
Chris, a young boy in the Pacific Northwest town of Seacliff, Washington, goes missing. Before he disappears, he writes a letter to Santa Claus, wishing that he would no longer exist in order to not trouble his divorcing parents.

Concerned that Chris is in danger of taking his own life, locals set out to find the missing child. Among them are struggling writer David Reynolds (Rick Roberts), jaded big-city reporter M.J. Jensen (Patricia Heaton), and Max (Peter Falk), a kind yet mysterious elderly man (who is actually an angel in disguise; the character is featured in two later movies).

Cast
 Patricia Heaton as M.J. Jensen
 Rick Roberts as David Reynolds
 Ernie Hudson as Ted
 Isabella Fink as Megan
 Jeffrey R. Smith as Syd
 Daniel Kash as Mayor Dennis
 Marnie McPhail as Isabel
 Peter Falk as Max
 Justin Blackburn as Young David
 Cassie MacDonald as Brittany
 Jeremy Akerman as Sheriff Bridges
 Nigel Bennett as Literary Agent
 Faith Ward as Mrs. Hargrave
 Stacy Smith as Rhonda (as Stacey Smith)
 Bill Carr as David's Boss
 Martha Irving as Sally

See also 
 List of Christmas films
 List of films about angels

References

External links
  
 http://www.rottentomatoes.com/m/a-town-without-christmas/

2001 television films
2001 films
American Christmas films
CBS network films
Films shot in Nova Scotia
Films directed by Andy Wolk
Christmas television films
Films set in Washington (state)
2000s English-language films